Nedong may refer to:

Nêdong County, county in Tibet
Nêdong (village), village in Tibet